Winifred Cawley (born Winifred Cozens) (24 January 1915 – 8 May 2001) was an English teacher and author of children's books. For Gran at Coalgate, published by Oxford University Press in 1974, she won the Guardian Children's Fiction Prize, a once-in-a-lifetime book award judged by a panel of British children's writers, and she was a commended runner up for the Carnegie Medal from the Library Association, recognising the year's best children's book by a British subject.

Life
Winifred was the daughter of servants in Felton, Northumberland, went to school in nearby Wallsend-on-Tyne, and continued at Newcastle University on scholarship for English studies. In 1937 she moved to University College London to earn a teaching diploma. She began study for a master's degree in Restoration drama but dropped out when she married Arthur Clare Cawley. She pursued a teaching career wherever he worked for the British Council: Romania, Yugoslavia, Egypt, Sheffield, Brisbane, Leeds.

In Brisbane, Australia, she wrote her first novel, Down The Long Stairs (1964), which she mailed to Oxford University Press. It was followed by Feast of the Serpent (1969), and then Gran at Coalgate (1974). Her last novel was the semi-autobiographical Silver Everything And Many Mansions (1976).

All four novels are set in Northumberland. The first two are English Civil War stories set in 1648 and 1649. The third features the dispute over wages and hours of British coal miners, and May lockout of miners, that is famous for the sympathetic General Strike of 1926. The fourth is based on her own experiences "growing up poor in the northeast of England between the wars".

According to Julia Eccleshare, Children's Book Editor for The Guardian, Cawley's four books for children "made a significant contribution in the early days of social realism in children's books ... Now so fashionable, stories about children from less affluent homes were almost non-existent until the late 1950s and 60s ..."; "Cawley contributed to the expanding horizons of children's books, not only on matters of class but also on the importance of place and region."

Notes

References

 

British children's writers
British historical novelists
Guardian Children's Fiction Prize winners
1915 births
2001 deaths
Place of death missing
British women children's writers
20th-century English novelists
20th-century English women writers
Women historical novelists